Jonas Hunziker  (born 15 May 1994) is a Swiss freestyle skier who competes internationally.

He competed in the 2011, 2013 and 2015 FIS Freestyle World Ski Championships, and represented Switzerland at the 2018 Winter Olympics in PyeongChang, where he made the slopestyle final.

References

External links

1994 births
Living people
Swiss male freestyle skiers
Olympic freestyle skiers of Switzerland
Freestyle skiers at the 2018 Winter Olympics
21st-century Swiss people